The 2023 LPGA of Japan Tour was the 55th season of the LPGA of Japan Tour, the professional golf tour for women operated by the Japan Ladies Professional Golfers' Association.

Schedule
The results of the season are given in the table below. "Date" is the end date of the tournament. The number in parentheses after winners' names shows the player's total number wins in official money individual events on the LPGA of Japan Tour, including that event.

Events in bold are majors.
^ The Toto Japan Classic was co-sanctioned with the LPGA Tour.

References

External links

2023
2023 in women's golf
2023 in Japanese sport
LPGA of Japan Tour